Luis Palomo (born 4 March 1906, date of death unknown) was a Spanish sports shooter. He competed at the 1948 Summer Olympics and 1960 Summer Olympics.

References

1906 births
Year of death missing
Spanish male sport shooters
Olympic shooters of Spain
Shooters at the 1948 Summer Olympics
Shooters at the 1960 Summer Olympics
Sportspeople from Madrid
20th-century Spanish people